Connie Francis sings "Second Hand Love" (also known as Connie Francis Sings) is a 1962 studio album by the American entertainer Connie Francis. It peaked at number 111 on the Billboard Top LPs chart. "Together" (1961) and "Don't Break the Heart That Loves You" (1962) both peaked at number one on the Easy Listening chart.

Track listing

Side one
"Second Hand Love" – 2:48
"Someone Else's Boy" – 2:39
"Together" – 2:51
"Too Many Rules" – 2:21
"(He's My) Dreamboat" – 2:40
"Gonna Git That Man" – 2:15

Side two
"Don't Break the Heart That Loves You" – 2:58
"Pretty Little Baby" – 2:15
"When the Boy in Your Arms (Is the Boy in Your Heart)" – 2:40
"It Happened Last Night" – 2:30
"Baby's First Christmas" – 2:20
"Breakin' in a Brand New Broken Heart" - 2:35

Charts

References 

1962 albums
Connie Francis albums
MGM Records albums